Hanne Gamborg Ekberg was born in 1962. She is a Danish former competitive figure skater. She is the 1983 Nordic champion and a two-time Danish national champion. She represented Denmark at ISU Championships in the 1980s. In her final competitive season, she placed 19th at the 1983 European Championships in Dortmund and 20th at the 1983 World Championships in Helsinki.

Competitive highlights

References 

1960s births
Danish female single skaters
Living people